David Roberts (1859 –  22 April 1928) was the Chief Engineer and managing director of Richard Hornsby & Sons in the early 1900s. His invention, the caterpillar track, was demonstrated to the army in 1907.

Chester
He grew up in Great Boughton in the east of Chester, the son of David Roberts and his wife Anne, being trained as a hydraulic engineer, starting work for Hydraulic Engineering Company Ltd in 1873, staying with them for fifteen years, living in England and overseas. He worked for Sir WG Armstrong Mitchell & Company Ltd in Elswick, Newcastle upon Tyne from 1888, staying for eight years. For two and a half years he was manager of their Italian works at Pozzuoli, in the Province of Naples.

Grantham
He joined Hornsbys in 1895 as Chief Engineer, and Works Manager, having been knowledgeable of Hornsbys development of the compression-ignition heavy oil engine and the worldwide engineering potential of it. He became general manager, then managing director in 1904 (until 1918). From 1918–20, he was Joint managing director of Ruston & Hornsby Ltd, retiring in 1920. He was Vice-President of Grantham Liberal Club on London Road.

At Hornsbys, his inventions included improvements to the Water-tube boiler.

The Caterpillar Tractor
In 1903, the War Office offered a prize of £1000 to produce a tractor that could haul a load of 25 tons for  without stopping for fuel or water.

Roberts, from this experience of the War Office competition, had the vision to design a vehicle for the British Army which would be able to traverse unstable ground. Vehicles such as Hornsby's 12-ton tractor would quickly be hindered by waterlogged surfaces with wheels sinking in mud. On 23 July 1904, his patent (No. 16,345) obviated this problem, with a vehicle where 

He submitted four other patents in later years, including No. 16,436 on 14 July 1909, which involved "Improvements in and connected with the Driving Axles of Chain Track Tractors and Locomotives".

In 1905, a Hornsby 20-hp 17-ton tractor was fitted with a chain track. In July 1905 and February 1906, it was demonstrated at Grantham to representatives from the War Office. In August 1906, the 1903 competition-winning tractor was fitted with chain tracks. On testing this vehicle in July 1907, the word caterpillar was first used to describe the machine (by British soldiers). In May 1908, this vehicle was demonstrated to King Edward VII and the Prince of Wales at Aldershot, who were introduced to David Roberts.

Hornsbys bought a  Rochet-Schneider car, powered by a petrol engine in 1906. It was fitted with a chain track and was trialled by the Army in November 1907 in Aldershot. Hornsbys, in a rare moment of marketing savoir-faire, commissioned a film of this vehicle to promote the virtues of the caterpillar track, which was to be shown at provincial and London cinemas in the summer of 1908. The film was first shown at the Empire Theatre of Varieties in Leicester Square on 27 April 1908, on a device then known as a bioscope. It was often of more interest than the actual film being shown, and is apparently the first film made for commercial purposes. Roberts was looking at increasing the speed of tracked vehicles. Hornsbys bought a  Mercedes car and fitted it with chained tracks with wooden wheels to test a desert environment. In 1910, Hornsbys sold four caterpillar tractors to the War Office—driving the first from Grantham to Aldershot. The tractors were used for towing artillery. Unfortunately, the officers in the Royal Artillery were not enamoured with the vehicle, finding it noisy and slow. One officer wrote, "The team of eight horses in my opinion is far superior under every condition."

Hornsbys thought civilian applications of the caterpillar track would be popular, but they only ended up selling one vehicle. Holt Manufacturing and C.L. Best Tractor Co. (the originator was Daniel Best) of the USA recognised its potential and sold many tracked vehicles; their vehicles were steered by a front wheel, unlike modern tanks. Hornsbys, with no incentives from military orders, did not see the same glowing future for the type of vehicle. They sold the patent to Holt, and only a year later, the British Army ordered 442 of Holt's caterpillar tracked vehicles made under licence by Ruston in Lincoln.

Family
He married Elizabeth Gertrude Anderson (born 1860 in Kingston upon Hull) in 1885, daughter of banker in Hull. They had four sons and a daughter: David (born c. 1887), William (born c. 1888, known as Willie) (both born in Chester), Marion (born c. 1890 in Pozzuoli, Italy), Kenneth (born 1891 in Gosforth, became managing director of the James Coultas agricultural engineering company in Grantham) and Cyril (born c. 1893 in Newcastle). In Newcastle, they lived at Elswick. In Grantham, they lived at 64 London Road. He died on 22 April 1928, aged 69, at his home "Beaconfield" on Beacon Lane in Grantham (the house is now the NHS Beaconfield Psychiatric Clinic). He was made a Freeman of the City of Chester. He was buried in Grantham Cemetery on 25 April 1928.

See also
 Tanks in World War I

References
 Grantham Journal Obituary, April 1928.
 The Times, 29 April 1908, Page 5

External links
 Biography in September 1985 "Steam Traction" article
 Hornsby "Little Caterpillar" in Bovington Tank Museum
 First steam caterpillar tractor in 1909

Patents
 US Patent 1135621 dated 13 April 1915, for a Golf and like Club (with Kenneth Roberts, his son)
 US Patent 1124061 dated 5 January 1915, for a Vaporizer for Internal Combustion Engines
 US Patent 983646 dated 11 February 1911 for a Vaporizer for Internal Combustion Engines (with John William Young)
 US Patent 979888 dated 27 December 1910, for a Governor for Internal-Combustion Engines (with Alfred Rowe Bellamy and Charles James)
 US Patent 975283 dated 8 November 1910, for a Mechanism for Transmitting Reciprocating Motion
 US Patent 972024 dated 4 October 1910, for an Internal Combustion Engine (with Charles James)
 US Patent 930798 dated 10 August 1909, for a portable track for motor vehicles (with Charles James)
 US Patent 916601 dated 30 March 1909, for a Traction Engine (caterpillar tractor, with Charles James)
 US Patent 910232 dated 19 January 1909, for a Steering device for Motor Vehicles (with Charles James)
 US Patent 904086 dated 17 November 1908, for an Internal Combustion Engine
 US Patent 798705 dated 5 September 1905, for a Steam Superheater
 US Patent 742356 dated 27 October 1903, for a Machine Tool
 US Patent 725875 dated 21 April 1903, for improvements to Water Tube Boilers
 US Patent 689491 dated 24 December 1901, for a Steam Generator (with William Hornsby and Charles James)
 US Patent 680593 dated 13 August 1901, for a Steam Generator (with William Hornsby).

English inventors
English engineers
People from Chester
People from Gosforth
Engineers from Tyne and Wear
1928 deaths
1859 births